"Hoy No Me Puedo Levantar" (Spanish for "Today I Can't Wake Up") is the debut single released by the spanish band Mecano as lead single for their homonymous debut studio album Mecano (1982). Released on June 22, 1981 by Discos CBS.

It is the first Mecano release, and serves as the lead single of their first studio album Mecano.

The original 7 inch release of the song came with a B-side called "Quiero Vivir En La Ciudad". Despite its resonance in radios, the song wasn't included on the debut album until the 1988 release, where it appears as a bonus track.

It instantly became a hit in Spain, where it sold over 100.000 equivalent copies among 1981 and 1982. Even though the song was a commercial success, "Hoy No Me Puedo Levantar" didn't make it to number one as other singles of Mecano did.

A mistake in the printing of the 7 inch single release occurred in which the date of the song release was dated as 1980, one year earlier than the original.

The song has been performed by some singers such as Edurne, and by some of the members of the band such as Nacho Cano himself.

Composition 

Mecano member Nacho Cano was trying to write a song for the record since his brother José María Cano had written all the songs. By 27 May 2015, Nacho Cano told periodist Ismael Cala for CNN en Español that the lyrics of the song came as a result of a hangover due to a party the day before. Cano also added that it was then when he discovered that creativity comes from every day experiences.

Formats

7-inch vinyl release

Digital download and streaming

Certifications

References 

Spanish-language songs
1981 songs
Mecano songs